Dănuț Lupu (born 27 February 1967) is a Romanian former football midfielder.

Club career
Dănuț Lupu played football and ice hockey simultaneously until the age of 14, when he decided to concentrate exclusively on his football career. He started to play professional football in 1985 at Dunarea Galați in the Romanian second league. In 1987 he was transferred at Dinamo București where he was wanted by coach Mircea Lucescu, playing his first Divizia A match on 8 March 1987 which ended with a 2–0 win against FC Brașov. In his first two seasons at Dinamo, the club finished runner-up in the championship but succeeded to win in the 1989–90 season the Divizia A title, with Lupu contributing with 6 goals scored in 22 Divizia A matches and the cup in which he scored one goal in the 6–4 victory from the final against Steaua București, also the team reached the 1989–90 UEFA Cup Winners' Cup semi-finals with Lupu playing 7 games in the campaign. 

After the fall of communism in December 1989, Lupu moved to Greece and signed with Panathinaikos, winning with The Greens the championship, although he played there only 10 league games in which he scored one goal. During his time in Greece, he also had spells at Korinthos and OFI Crete, gaining a total of 66 appearances with 5 goals scored in the Alpha Ethniki competition.

In 1994, he came back in Romania at Rapid București, but after only two Divizia A games played he went to play for Brescia in Italy, making 15 Serie A appearances in which he scored one goal in a 1–0 home victory in front of Reggiana. Then Lupu returned to play for a short while at Rapid, afterwards spending the next two seasons with Dinamo. In 1997, when his former coach from Dinamo and Brescia, Mircea Lucescu became Rapid's coach, Lupu returned for a third spell and after finishing runner-up in the first season, he won the championship in the following one, contributing with 5 goals scored in 28 matches. In 2000 he returned for a third spell at Dinamo just for a short time in which he made his last Divizia A appearance on 27 August in a 2–1 loss in front of Oțelul Galați, having a total of 228 matches with 44 goals scored in the competition. Afterwards he played for Laminorul Roman in the Romanian second league and ended his career in Israel at Hapoel Tzafririm.

In the European Cups, Lupu played for Dinamo București, Panathinaikos and Rapid București a total of 39 matches and scored 3 goals (including 7 appearances in the Intertoto Cup).

International career
Dănuț Lupu played 14 matches without scoring for Romania, making his debut on 11 October 1989 when coach Emerich Jenei sent him on the field in the 64th minute in order to replace Ioan Sabău in a 1990 World Cup qualifiers match which ended with a 3–0 loss against Denmark, also appearing in the second leg which ended with a 3–1 victory. He appeared in two games at the 1990 World Cup, a 1–1 in the group stage against Argentina and a 0–0 (5–4, after penalty kicks) loss against Ireland in the eight-finals. Lupu played four games at the successful Euro 1996 qualifiers, but was not part of the national team's squad at the final tournament, making his last appearance for the national team on 18 March 1998 in a friendly which ended with a 1–0 loss against Israel.

Controversy
During Dinamo's stay in Dundee for a game against Dundee United in the 1988–89 European Cup Winners' Cup, Dănuț Lupu was arrested for shoplifting, but was released after coach Mircea Lucescu went to the police station and convinced the prosecutor to not make him a criminal record.

While playing for Panathinaikos, Lupu was arrested in Athens and spent two months and a half in jail, being accused of being the leader of a gang of Romanian thieves who had stolen cars in Greece. Lupu claims he was arrested because Panathinaikos's president Yiorgos Vardinogiannis wanted him to sign the termination of the contract and to give up insisting to receive his unpaid salaries.

In 2005 he was caught at an airport from București with 79,000 undeclared euros stashed in shoe boxes; also in the same year he was caught driving an unregistered car.

Personal life
His nephew, Valentin Balint is also a footballer who started his career at Dinamo București.

Honours
Dinamo București
Divizia A: 1989–90
Cupa României: 1989–90, 2000–01
Panathinaikos
Greek Championship: 1990–91
Greek Football Cup: 1990–91
Rapid București
Divizia A: 1998–99
Cupa României: 1997–98
Supercupa României: 1999

References

External links

1967 births
Living people
Sportspeople from Galați
Romanian footballers
Romania international footballers
Romanian expatriate footballers
FC Dinamo București players
FC Rapid București players
Panathinaikos F.C. players
Brescia Calcio players
Expatriate footballers in Italy
Serie A players
Liga I players
Liga II players
Expatriate footballers in Greece
Super League Greece players
Korinthos F.C. players
OFI Crete F.C. players
Hapoel Tzafririm Holon F.C. players
Expatriate footballers in Israel
1990 FIFA World Cup players
Association football midfielders